KSOP (1370 kHz) is an AM radio station broadcasting a Classic Country format. Licensed to South Salt Lake, Utah, United States, the station serves the Salt Lake City metropolitan area.  The station is currently owned by Ksop, Inc.
The station was founded in 1955 by Henry Hilton, a Utah native who had worked in other local radio stations before founding this independent business.

History
Both KSOP AM and FM have broadcast country music since their first air dates. KSOP AM came on air in 1955 and was initially operated during the day only. Today the Hilton family continues operating KSOP AM and FM. Its studios are located near Redwood Road in Salt Lake City, while its transmitter site is west of downtown.

From December 1964 through the spring of 2002, KSOP-AM was a simulcast of KSOP-FM. As of June 26, 2002, KSOP-AM has flipped to the current Classic Country format.

References

External links
FCC History Cards for KSOP

Country radio stations in the United States
Radio stations established in 1955
SOP
Mass media in Salt Lake City
1955 establishments in Utah